Dala  is a town and  municipality in Lunda Sul Province in Angola. The municipality had a population of 29,991 in 2014.

References

Populated places in Lunda Sul Province
Municipalities of Angola